R. L. Carns was an American football coach.  He served as the 11th head football coach at Doane College in Crete, Nebraska and he held that position for the 1908 season.  His coaching record at Doane was 3–4.

References

Year of birth missing
Year of death missing
Doane Tigers football coaches
Doane University alumni